Kamla Rai College is a degree college in Gopalganj, Bihar, India. It is a constituent unit of Jai Prakash University. The college offers intermediate, three years degree course (TDC) and post graduate degree in arts and science.

History 
The college was established in the year 1956.

Departments 

 Arts
 Hindi
 Urdu
  English
 Sanskrit
 Philosophy
 Economics
 Political Science
 History
 Geography
 Psychology
 Science
 Mathematics
 Physics
 Chemistry
 Zoology
 Botany

References

External links 

 Official website
 Jai Prakash University website

Colleges in India
Constituent colleges of Jai Prakash University
Educational institutions established in 1956
1956 establishments in Bihar